10.9 may refer to:

 OS X 10.9, the version number of the Apple operating system OS X Mavericks
 .44 caliber, ammunition of 10.9 mm caliber